Below is a list of notable footballers who have played for Napoli. Generally, this means players have played at least 50 matches or scored 10 goals for the club, but some players who have played fewer matches are included, if they have had success at other clubs or appeared at least once in the national team.

List of players

Players are listed according to the date of their first-team debut for the club. Appearances and goals are for the first team, including appearances as substitutes, correct 
{| class="wikitable sortable" style="text-align:center"
!style="width:16em"|Name!!Nationality!!Position!!Napoli career!!Appearances!!Goals
|-
|align="left"|||align="left"|||DF||||2||0
|-
|align="left"|||align="left"|||FW||1926–1930||39||13
|-
|align="left"|||align="left"|||FW||1926–1930||62||4
|-
|align="left"|||align="left"|||MF||1926–1931||100||0
|-
|align="left"|||align="left"|||DF||1926–1937||213||6
|-
|align="left"|||align="left"|||FW||1926–1937||266||108
|-
|align="left"|||align="left"|||MF||1927–1929||49||17
|-
|align="left"|||align="left"|||MF||1928–1931||91||5
|-
|align="left"|||align="left"|||FW/MF||1928–1931||51||5
|-
|align="left"|||align="left"|||MF/FW||1928–1938||270||41
|-
|align="left"|||align="left"|||MF||1929–1932||94||32
|-
|align="left"|||align="left"|||DF||1929–1935||172||0
|-
|align="left"|||align="left"|||FW/MF||1929–1935||196||103
|-
|align="left"|||align="left"|||GK||1929–1936||156||0
|-
|align="left"|||align="left"|||FW/MF||1930–1932||54||11
|-
|align="left"|||align="left"|||DF||1930–1933||49||0
|-
|align="left"|||align="left"|||MF||1930–1937||219||6
|-
|align="left"|||align="left"|||DF||1930–1940||182||0
|-
|align="left"|||align="left"|||MF||1931–1932||26||0
|-
|align="left"|||align="left"|||FW||1931–1932||15||6
|-
|align="left"|||align="left"|||MF||1931–1934||62||6
|-
|align="left"|||align="left"|||MF||1932–1935||39||12
|-
|align="left"|||align="left"|||FW||1932–1936||85||14
|-
|align="left"|||align="left"|||MF||1933–1934||1||0
|-
|align="left"|||align="left"|||MF||1933–1936||90||2
|-
|align="left"|||align="left"|||FW/MF||1933–1937||128||29
|-
|align="left"|||align="left"|||FW/MF||1933–1943||188||34
|-
|align="left"|||align="left"|||FW||1934–1935||20||3
|-
|align="left"|||align="left"|||GK||1934–19431945–1948||235||0
|-
|align="left"|||align="left"|||FW||1935–1936||30||12
|-
|align="left"|||align="left"|||MF||1935–1937||40||7
|-
|align="left"|||align="left"|||GK||1935–1938||58||0
|-
|align="left"|||align="left"|||DF||1935–1940||123||0
|-
|align="left"|||align="left"|||MF||1935–1943||90||0
|-
|align="left"|||align="left"|||MF||1936–1940||94||17
|-
|align="left"|||align="left"|||DF||1937–1939||58||1
|-
|align="left"|||align="left"|||MF||1937–1940||82||8
|-
|align="left"|||align="left"|||FW/MF||1937–1940||77||14
|-
|align="left"|||align="left"|||MF/FW||1937–1940||55||8
|-
|align="left"|Giuseppe Gerbi||align="left"|||FW||1937–1940||29||9
|-
|align="left"|||align="left"|||DF||1937–1949||229||1
|-
|align="left"|||align="left"|||DF||1938–1939||25||1
|-
|align="left"|||align="left"|||FW||1938–1941||27||2
|-
|align="left"|||align="left"|||MF||1938–1943||108||8
|-
|align="left"|||align="left"|||MF/DF||1938–19401946–1947||68||9
|-
|align="left"|||align="left"|||MF/DF||1938–19431949–1955||275||4
|-
|align="left"|||align="left"|||MF||1939–1941||52||18
|-
|align="left"|||align="left"|||FW||1939–1941||55||19
|-
|align="left"|||align="left"|||DF||1939–1942||49||0
|-
|align="left"|||align="left"|||FW||1940–1942||49||12
|-
|align="left"|||align="left"|||FW||1940–1943||60||15
|-
|align="left"|||align="left"|||MF||1940–19431945–1946||94||2
|-
|align="left"|||align="left"|||FW/MF||1940–1948||174||46
|-
|align="left"|||align="left"|||DF||1941–1947||119||0
|-
|align="left"|||align="left"|||MF||1941–19441945–1948||144||18
|-
|align="left"|||align="left"|||MF||1941–19421945–1950||88||1
|-
|align="left"|||align="left"|||MF||1941–19431945–1951||153||7
|-
|align="left"|||align="left"|||FW||1942–1943||32||17
|-
|align="left"|||align="left"|||MF||1942–19431946–1948||49||2
|-
|align="left"|||align="left"|||MF||1945–1946||4||0
|-
|align="left"|||align="left"|||FW||1945–1946||27||6
|-
|align="left"|||align="left"|||MF||1945–1948||93||11
|-
|align="left"|||align="left"|||MF||1945–1949||149||3
|-
|align="left"|||align="left"|||FW/MF||1945–1949||108||31
|-
|align="left"|||align="left"|||FW||1946–1948||47||20
|-
|align="left"|||align="left"|||MF||1946–1949||64||14
|-
|align="left"|||align="left"|||MF||1946–1949||54||3
|-
|align="left"|||align="left"|||GK||1946–1950||121||0
|-
|align="left"|||align="left"|||FW||1946–19471949–1950||31||7
|-
|align="left"|||align="left"|||FW||1947–1949||33||6
|-
|align="left"|||align="left"|||FW/MF||1947–1952||168||40
|-
|align="left"|||align="left"|||FW/MF||1948–1949||14||1
|-
|align="left"|||align="left"|||FW||1948–1949||1||0
|-
|align="left"|||align="left"|||FW||1948–1949||27||8
|-
|align="left"|||align="left"|||DF||1948–1951||87||5
|-
|align="left"|||align="left"|||FW||1948–1951||54||21
|-
|align="left"|||align="left"|||FW||1949–1950||38||12
|-
|align="left"|||align="left"|||MF||1949–1952||94||14
|-
|align="left"|||align="left"|||FW||1949–1953||88||31
|-
|align="left"|||align="left"|||DF||1949–1954||127||0
|-
|align="left"|||align="left"|||DF||1950–1951||28||5
|-
|align="left"|||align="left"|||MF||1950–1952||30||10
|-
|align="left"|||align="left"|||GK||1950–1953||107||0
|-
|align="left"|||align="left"|||MF||1950–1954||103||23
|-
|align="left"|||align="left"|||FW/MF||1950–19531954–1955||25||9
|-
|align="left"|||align="left"|||FW||1950–1956||171||47
|-
|align="left"|||align="left"|||MF||1950–1957||169||4
|-
|align="left"|||align="left"|||FW||1951–1952||11||2
|-
|align="left"|||align="left"|||FW||1951–1952||21||8
|-
|align="left"|||align="left"|||DF||1951–1955||124||5
|-
|align="left"|||align="left"|||DF/MF||1951–1956||121||7
|-
|align="left"|||align="left"|||DF||1951–1960||251||4
|-
|align="left"|||align="left"|||FW||1952–1956||112||51
|-
|align="left"|||align="left"|||FW/MF||1952–1957||136||41
|-
|align="left"|||align="left"|||FW/MF||1952–1960||253||27
|-
|align="left"|||align="left"|||MF/FW||1953–1957||93||10
|-
|align="left"|||align="left"|||GK||1953–1961||261||0
|-
|align="left"|||align="left"|||DF||1954–1956||66||0
|-
|align="left"|||align="left"|||MF||1954–1960||171||13
|-
|align="left"|||align="left"|||MF/DF||1954–1961||208||13
|-
|align="left"|||align="left"|||FW||1955–1960||155||70
|-
|align="left"|||align="left"|||DF||1955–1962||194||1
|-
|align="left"|||align="left"|||DF||1955–1966||159||1
|-
|align="left"|||align="left"|||FW/MF||1956–1959||65||10
|-
|align="left"|||align="left"|||MF||1956–1960||69||3
|-
|align="left"|||align="left"|||MF||1956–1960||97||1
|-
|align="left"|||align="left"|||FW/MF||1957–1959||40||9
|-
|align="left"|||align="left"|||MF||1957–1961||69||8
|-
|align="left"|||align="left"|||FW||1957–1961||127||37
|-
|align="left"|||align="left"|||FW||1957–1961||71||28
|-
|align="left"|||align="left"|||MF||1958–1960||35||8
|-
|align="left"|||align="left"|||DF||1959–1962||64||1
|-
|align="left"|||align="left"|||GK||1959–1969||56||0
|-
|align="left"|||align="left"|||MF||1960–1961||19||2
|-
|align="left"|||align="left"|||FW||1960–1961||22||3
|-
|align="left"|||align="left"|||FW||1960–1966||127||19
|-
|align="left"|||align="left"|||MF/DF||1960–1968||224||6
|-
|align="left"|||align="left"|||DF||1961–1963||68||0
|-
|align="left"|||align="left"|||MF/FW||1961–1963||40||2
|-
|align="left"|||align="left"|||FW/MF||1961–1963||39||8
|-
|align="left"|||align="left"|||FW||1961–1963||87||19
|-
|align="left"|||align="left"|||GK||1961–1964||94||0
|-
|align="left"|||align="left"|||MF||1961–1964||43||0
|-
|align="left"|||align="left"|||FW||1961–1965||57||15
|-
|align="left"|||align="left"|||MF||1961–1965||105||23
|-
|align="left"|||align="left"|||FW/MF||1961–1965||120||26
|-
|align="left"|||align="left"|||DF||1961–1966||136||6
|-
|align="left"|||align="left"|||DF/MF||1961–1967||227||15
|-
|align="left"|||align="left"|||MF||1961–19701971–19721973–19741975–1977||214||13
|-
|align="left"|||align="left"|||MF||1962–1964||48||7
|-
|align="left"|Cané||align="left"|||FW||1962–19691972–1975||254||70
|-
|align="left"|||align="left"|||MF||1962–1978||505||38
|-
|align="left"|||align="left"|||DF||1963–1964||32||0
|-
|align="left"|||align="left"|||MF||1963–1966||45||9
|-
|align="left"|||align="left"|||MF||1963–1966||75||0
|-
|align="left"|||align="left"|||DF||1964–1966||49||2
|-
|align="left"|||align="left"|||GK||1964–1967||113||0
|-
|align="left"|||align="left"|||FW||1964–1967||55||14
|-
|align="left"|||align="left"|||DF||1964–1973||262||2
|-
|align="left"|||align="left"|||DF||1964–1974||254||4
|-
|align="left"|||align="left"|||DF||1965–1969||75||0
|-
|align="left"|||align="left"|||FW/MF||1965–1969||76||16
|-
|align="left"|||align="left"|||DF||1965–1971||169||0
|-
|align="left"|||align="left"|||FW||1965–1972||234||97
|-
|align="left"|||align="left"|||FW||1966–1968||74||14
|-
|align="left"|||align="left"|||DF||1966–1969||40||0
|-
|align="left"|||align="left"|||MF||1966–1971||150||20
|-
|align="left"|||align="left"|||FW/MF||1967–1970||82||16
|-
|align="left"|||align="left"|||GK||1967–1972||190||0
|-
|align="left"|||align="left"|||DF||1967–1977||263||8
|-
|align="left"|||align="left"|||DF||1968–1969||27||0
|-
|align="left"|||align="left"|||MF||1968–1969||33||3
|-
|align="left"|||align="left"|||FW||1968–1969||19||5
|-
|align="left"|||align="left"|||DF||1969–1971||63||2
|-
|align="left"|||align="left"|||FW||1969–1971||34||5
|-
|align="left"|||align="left"|||FW/MF||1969–19701971–1972||60||7
|-
|align="left"|||align="left"|||MF||1969–19731979–1980||181||22
|-
|align="left"|||align="left"|||FW||1970–1972||69||13
|-
|align="left"|||align="left"|||DF||1970–19721973–1974||66||1
|-
|align="left"|||align="left"|||GK||1972–1977||194||0
|-
|align="left"|||align="left"|||DF||1972–1977||121||1
|-
|align="left"|||align="left"|||MF||1972–1977||176||8
|-
|align="left"|||align="left"|||FW/MF||1972–19731979–1982||128||26
|-
|align="left"|||align="left"|||DF||1972–1988||511||11
|-
|align="left"|||align="left"|||FW||1973–1975||66||32
|-
|align="left"|||align="left"|||DF||1973–1976||33||0
|-
|align="left"|||align="left"|||FW||1973–1976||110||35
|-
|align="left"|||align="left"|||MF||1973–1977||156||8
|-
|align="left"|||align="left"|||DF||1974–1977||118||1
|-
|align="left"|||align="left"|||FW/MF||1974–1978||150||36
|-
|align="left"|||align="left"|||DF||1974–1978||116||5
|-
|align="left"|||align="left"|||FW||1975–1979||165||77
|-
|align="left"|||align="left"|||FW/MF||1976–1978||48||10
|-
|align="left"|||align="left"|||DF||1976–1979||70||0
|-
|align="left"|||align="left"|||FW||1976–19771979–1981||79||13
|-
|align="left"|||align="left"|||MF||1976–1983||253||5
|-
|align="left"|||align="left"|||MF||1977–1979||58||7
|-
|align="left"|||align="left"|||FW||1977–19811982–1983||87||13
|-
|align="left"|||align="left"|||FW||1977–19781979–1982||85||12
|-
|align="left"|||align="left"|||DF||1977–1988||396||11
|-
|align="left"|||align="left"|||MF/FW||1978–1979||24||1
|-
|align="left"|||align="left"|||FW||1978–19791980–1984||175||41
|-
|align="left"|||align="left"|||DF||1978–1980||50||3
|-
|align="left"|||align="left"|||DF||1978–1980||55||0
|-
|align="left"|||align="left"|||MF||1978–1980||70||3
|-
|align="left"|||align="left"|||GK||1978–1985||258||0
|-
|align="left"|||align="left"|||DF||1979–1980||34||0
|-
|align="left"|||align="left"|||MF||1979–1982||96||10
|-
|align="left"|||align="left"|||DF||1979–19831984–1986||143||4
|-
|align="left"|||align="left"|||MF||1979–19811982–1987||145||2
|-
|align="left"|||align="left"|||DF||1980–1981||29||0
|-
|align="left"|||align="left"|||DF||1980–1984||125||1
|-
|align="left"|||align="left"|||DF||1981–1983||63||2
|-
|align="left"|||align="left"|||MF||1981–1983||78||5
|-
|align="left"|||align="left"|||FW||1981–19821983–1984||50||2
|-
|align="left"|||align="left"|||DF||1981–19871988–1989||107||3
|-
|align="left"|||align="left"|||FW||1982–1983||38||8
|-
|align="left"|||align="left"|||MF||1982–1985||101||10
|-
|align="left"|Dirceu||align="left"|||MF||1983–1984||35||6
|-
|align="left"|||align="left"|||FW||1983–1984||33||8
|-
|align="left"|||align="left"|||MF/FW||1983–1987||129||11
|-
|align="left"|||align="left"|||FW/MF||1984–1986||63||18
|-
|align="left"|||align="left"|||MF||1984–1988||135||17
|-
|align="left"|||align="left"|||FW||1984–19861987–1988||12||0
|-
|align="left"|||align="left"|||FW||1984–1991||259||115
|-
|align="left"|||align="left"|||DF||1984–1994||322||15
|-
|align="left"|||align="left"|||MF||1985–1986||29||1
|-
|align="left"|||align="left"|||MF||1985–1986||9||0
|-
|align="left"|||align="left"|||GK||1985–1988||115||0
|-
|align="left"|||align="left"|||FW||1985–1988||109||37
|-
|align="left"|||align="left"|||DF||1985–1991||194||17
|-
|align="left"|||align="left"|||DF||1985–19891991–1992||80||0
|-
|align="left"|||align="left"|||MF||1986–1989||91||7
|-
|align="left"|||align="left"|||MF||1986–1992||242||9
|-
|align="left"|||align="left"|||GK||1986–19881990–19911993–1999||203||0
|-
|align="left"|||align="left"|||DF||1986–1990||59||0
|-
|align="left"|||align="left"|||FW||1986–1990||154||47
|-
|align="left"|Careca||align="left"|||FW||1987–1993||221||95
|-
|align="left"|||align="left"|||DF||1987–1994||250||17
|-
|align="left"|||align="left"|||GK||1988–1990||98||0
|-
|align="left"|||align="left"|||MF/DF||1988–1990||96||2
|-
|align="left"|Alemão||align="left"|||MF||1988–1992||133||14
|-
|align="left"|||align="left"|||MF||1988–1993||206||11
|-
|align="left"|||align="left"|||DF||1988–1994||230||3
|-
|align="left"|||align="left"|||DF||1989–1991||77||4
|-
|align="left"|||align="left"|||MF||1989–1993||90||4
|-
|align="left"|||align="left"|||FW/MF||1989–1993||136||36
|-
|align="left"|||align="left"|||DF||19891991–1996||118||0
|-
|align="left"|||align="left"|||MF||1989–19911992–19931994–1999||116||4
|-
|align="left"|||align="left"|||MF||1990–1991||41||0
|-
|align="left"|||align="left"|||FW||1990–1991||32||11
|-
|align="left"|||align="left"|||FW||1990–1992||50||9
|-
|align="left"|||align="left"|||GK||1990–1993||123||0
|-
|align="left"|||align="left"|||DF||1991–1992||34||6
|-
|align="left"|||align="left"|||FW||1991–1992||31||7
|-
|align="left"|||align="left"|||DF||1992–1994||38||0
|-
|align="left"|||align="left"|||MF||1992–1994||55||1
|-
|align="left"|||align="left"|||FW||1992–1994||69||39
|-
|align="left"|||align="left"|||DF||1992–1995||68||1
|-
|align="left"|||align="left"|||MF/DF||1992–1996||100||1
|-
|align="left"|||align="left"|||DF/MF||1992–1997||113||15
|-
|align="left"|||align="left"|||MF||1993–1994||22||0
|-
|align="left"|||align="left"|||FW||1993–1994||27||5
|-
|align="left"|||align="left"|||MF/FW||1993–1996||108||12
|-
|align="left"|||align="left"|||MF/DF||1993–1997||122||0
|-
|align="left"|||align="left"|||MF||1993–19972000–2001||172||24
|-
|align="left"|||align="left"|||MF||1994–1995||38||7
|-
|align="left"|||align="left"|||FW/MF||1994–1995||40||11
|-
|align="left"|||align="left"|||FW||1994–1996||74||17
|-
|align="left"|||align="left"|||DF||1994–1997||98||14
|-
|align="left"|||align="left"|||MF||1994–1997||69||5
|-
|align="left"|||align="left"|||MF||1994–1998||65||0
|-
|align="left"|||align="left"|||DF||1995–1997||54||0
|-
|align="left"|||align="left"|||DF||1995–1998||96||1
|-
|align="left"|||align="left"|||DF||1995–20012002–2003||195||2
|-
|align="left"|Beto||align="left"|||MF||1996–1997||26||5
|-
|align="left"|||align="left"|||FW||1996–1997||40||7
|-
|align="left"|Caio||align="left"|||FW||1996–1997||24||1
|-
|align="left"|||align="left"|||FW||1996–1997||34||10
|-
|align="left"|||align="left"|||DF||1996–1998||51||0
|-
|align="left"|||align="left"|||MF||1996–19971998–1999||55||6
|-
|align="left"|||align="left"|||DF||1996–19981999–20002004–2005||78||4
|-
|align="left"|||align="left"|||MF/FW||1996–2000||126||20
|-
|align="left"|||align="left"|||MF||1997||4||0
|-
|align="left"|||align="left"|||MF||1997||5||1
|-
|align="left"|||align="left"|||DF||1997–1998||4||0
|-
|align="left"|||align="left"|||MF||1997–1998||15||0
|-
|align="left"|||align="left"|||FW||1997–1998||31||6
|-
|align="left"|||align="left"|||FW||1997–1998||7||0
|-
|align="left"|||align="left"|||DF||1997–1999||17||0
|-
|align="left"|||align="left"|||MF||1997–1999||59||3
|-
|align="left"|||align="left"|||FW||1997–2001||101||28
|-
|align="left"|||align="left"|||DF||1997–19982003–2004||42||3
|-
|align="left"|||align="left"|||MF||1998–1999||20||2
|-
|align="left"|||align="left"|||DF||1998–2000||56||0
|-
|align="left"|||align="left"|||MF||1998–2000||51||3
|-
|align="left"|||align="left"|||DF||1998–2002||59||1
|-
|align="left"|||align="left"|||MF||1998–2002||127||6
|-
|align="left"|||align="left"|||DF||1997–19982000–2003||74||2
|-
|align="left"|||align="left"|||DF||1998–2003||84||1
|-
|align="left"|||align="left"|||DF||1998–20002004–2005||83||2
|-
|align="left"|||align="left"|||DF||1999–2000||45||1
|-
|align="left"|||align="left"|||FW||1999–2000||66||32
|-
|align="left"|||align="left"|||MF||1999–2001||61||1
|-
|align="left"|||align="left"|||FW||1999–2003||102||33
|-
|align="left"|||align="left"|||MF||2000||15||2
|-
|align="left"|||align="left"|||MF/FW||2000||11||2
|-
|align="left"|||align="left"|||DF||2000–2001||22||0
|-
|align="left"|||align="left"|||DF||2000–2001||28||0
|-
|align="left"|||align="left"|||DF||2000–2001||24||1
|-
|align="left"|||align="left"|||FW||2000–2001||32||10
|-
|align="left"|||align="left"|||FW/MF||2000–2002||26||1
|-
|align="left"|||align="left"|||MF||2000–20012002–2003||44||1
|-
|align="left"|||align="left"|||MF/DF||2000–2002||53||9
|-
|align="left"|||align="left"|||GK||2000–2003||87||0
|-
|align="left"|||align="left"|||DF||2000–2004||52||0
|-
|align="left"|||align="left"|||MF||2000–2004||91||8
|-
|align="left"|||align="left"|||FW||2000–2004||68||3
|-
|align="left"|||align="left"|||FW/MF||2000–2004||82||6
|-
|align="left"|Edmundo||align="left"|||FW||2001||17||4
|-
|align="left"|Amauri||align="left"|||FW||2001||6||1
|-
|align="left"|||align="left"|||DF||2001–2004||102||3
|-
|align="left"|||align="left"|||MF||2001–2004||80||8
|-
|align="left"|||align="left"|||GK||2002–2003||4||0
|-
|align="left"|||align="left"|||FW||2002–2003||14||0
|-
|align="left"|||align="left"|||FW||2002–2004||64||27
|-
|align="left"|||align="left"|||GK||2003–2004||50||0
|-
|align="left"|||align="left"|||DF||2003–2004||32||0
|-
|align="left"|||align="left"|||DF||2003–2004||26||0
|-
|align="left"|||align="left"|||DF||2003–2004||9||0
|-
|align="left"|||align="left"|||DF/MF||2003–2004||39||5
|-
|align="left"|||align="left"|||MF||2003–2004||47||0
|-
|align="left"|||align="left"|||MF||2003–2004||37||5
|-
|align="left"|||align="left"|||FW||2003–2004||29||5
|-
|align="left"|||align="left"|||DF||20032004||32||0
|-
|align="left"|||align="left"|||MF||2003–2007||72||1
|-
|align="left"|||align="left"|||MF||20032004–2009||166||6
|-
|align="left"|||align="left"|||MF||2004||15||3
|-
|align="left"|||align="left"|||MF/DF||2004–2005||11||0
|-
|align="left"|||align="left"|||MF||2004–2005||33||2
|-
|align="left"|||align="left"|||MF||2004–20062006–2008||53||0
|-
|align="left"|||align="left"|||FW||2004–2008||131||30
|-
|align="left"|||align="left"|||FW||2004–20082013||136||44
|-
|align="left"|||align="left"|||GK||2005||2||0
|-
|align="left"|||align="left"|||DF||2005–2008||74||2
|-
|align="left"|||align="left"|||MF/FW||2005–2008||63||6
|-
|align="left"|||align="left"|||DF||2005–2009||80||0
|-
|align="left"|||align="left"|||MF||2005–20072008–2010||68||1
|-
|align="left"|||align="left"|||FW||2005–20072008–2010||101||23
|-
|align="left"|||align="left"|||MF||2005–2010||158||20
|-
|align="left"|||align="left"|||MF/DF||2005–20072008–20092010–2011||43||4
|-
|align="left"|||align="left"|||GK||2005–2011||119||0
|-
|align="left"|||align="left"|||DF||2005–2013||180||2
|-
|align="left"|||align="left"|||MF||2006–2007||48||3
|-
|align="left"|||align="left"|||FW||2006–2007||34||11
|-
|align="left"|||align="left"|||DF||2006–2008||41||1
|-
|align="left"|||align="left"|||DF||2006–2008||73||14
|-
|align="left"|||align="left"|||MF||2006–2009||43||5
|-
|align="left"|||align="left"|||DF||1998–19992006–2013||278||9
|-
|align="left"|||align="left"|||FW||2007–2009||56||12
|-
|align="left"|||align="left"|||DF||2007–2010||86||1
|-
|align="left"|||align="left"|||MF||2007–20092010–2011||73||0
|-
|align="left"|||align="left"|||FW||2007–2012||188||48
|-
|align="left"|||align="left"|||MF||2007–20122014–2015||235||4
|-
|align="left"|||align="left"|||MF||2007–2019||520||121
|-
|align="left"|||align="left"|||FW||2008–2010||72||15
|-
|align="left"|||align="left"|||DF||2008–2011||62||0
|-
|align="left"|||align="left"|||MF||2008–2011||121||4
|-
|align="left"|||align="left"|||DF||2008–201020112012–2013||44||3
|-
|align="left"|||align="left"|||DF||2008–2013||141||0
|-
|align="left"|||align="left"|||DF/MF||2008–2018||308||23
|-
|align="left"|||align="left"|||GK||2009||1||0
|-
|align="left"|||align="left"|||MF||2009–2010||25||1
|-
|align="left"|||align="left"|||MF||2009–2010||29||2
|-
|align="left"|||align="left"|||FW||2009–2010||11||1
|-
|align="left"|||align="left"|||FW||2009–2010||37||11
|-
|align="left"|||align="left"|||GK||2009–2013||175||0
|-
|align="left"|||align="left"|||DF||2009–2013||143||4
|-
|align="left"|||align="left"|||DF/MF||2009–2016||162||4
|-
|align="left"|||align="left"|||FW/MF||2009–20102012–2022||434||122
|-
|align="left"|||align="left"|||MF||2010–2011||39||1
|-
|align="left"|||align="left"|||MF||2010–2011||31||1
|-
|align="left"|||align="left"|||FW||2010–2012||14||1
|-
|align="left"|||align="left"|||DF/MF||2010–2013||109||3
|-
|align="left"|||align="left"|||FW||2010–2013||138||104
|-
|align="left"|||align="left"|||DF||2011||7||0
|-
|align="left"|||align="left"|||MF||2011||11||0
|-
|align="left"|||align="left"|||FW||2011–2012||25||4
|-
|align="left"|||align="left"|||DF||2011–20122013–2014||64||2
|-
|align="left"|||align="left"|||MF||2011–2014||109||18
|-
|align="left"|||align="left"|||FW||2011–2014||124||22
|-
|align="left"|||align="left"|||DF||2011–2015||99||3
|-
|align="left"|||align="left"|||MF||2011–2015||166||13
|-
|align="left"|||align="left"|||FW||2012||28||3
|-
|align="left"|||align="left"|||DF||2012–2013||30||1
|-
|align="left"|||align="left"|||MF||2012–20132015–2017||43||3
|-
|align="left"|||align="left"|||DF||20122013–2014||2||0
|-
|align="left"|||align="left"|||MF||2012–2014||70||0
|-
|align="left"|||align="left"|||DF/MF||2012–2015||52||1
|-
|align="left"|Rolando||align="left"|||DF||2013||9||0
|-
|align="left"|||align="left"|||DF/MF||2013||33||0
|-
|align="left"|||align="left"|||GK||2013–20142015–2018||182||0
|-
|align="left"|||align="left"|||DF||2013–2014||18||0
|-
|align="left"|||align="left"|||MF||2013–2015||10||0
|-
|align="left"|||align="left"|||GK||2013–2018||45||0
|-
|align="left"|||align="left"|||DF||2013–2019||236||6
|-
|align="left"|||align="left"|||FW/MF||2013–2022||397||148
|-
|align="left"|||align="left"|||FW/MF||2013–2020||349||82
|-
|align="left"|||align="left"|||FW||2013–2015||53||15
|-
|align="left"|||align="left"|||FW||2013–2016||146||91
|-
|align="left"|||align="left"|||GK||2014–2015||27||0
|-
|align="left"|||align="left"|||DF||2014–2022||216||3
|-
|align="left"|||align="left"|||DF||2014–2022||317||14
|-
|align="left"|Henrique||align="left"|||DF||2014–2016||38||2
|-
|align="left"|||align="left"|||MF||2014–2016||79||3
|-
|align="left"|Jorginho||align="left"|||MF||2014–2018||160||6
|-
|align="left"|||align="left"|||MF||2014–2016||36||7
|-
|align="left"|Michu||align="left"|||FW/MF||2014–2015||6||0
|-
|align="left"|Gabriel||align="left"|||GK||2015–2016||4||0
|-
|align="left"|||align="left"|||DF||2015–2017||39||0
|-
|align="left"|||align="left"|||FW||2015–2017||79||25
|-
|align="left"|||align="left"|||DF||2015–2019||48||4
|-
|align="left"|||align="left"|||DF||2015–2021||223||1
|-
|align="left"|Allan||align="left"|||MF||2015–2020||212||11
|-
|align="left"|||align="left"|||MF||2015–2016||16||0
|-
|align="left"|||align="left"|||MF||2015–2016||9||1
|-
|align="left"|||align="left"|||MF||2016–||316||47
|-
|align="left"|||align="left"|||FW||2016–2021||122||48
|-
|align="left"|||align="left"|||DF||2016–20172018–2021||99||2
|-
|align="left"|||align="left"|||FW/MF||2016–2017||24||2
|-
|align="left"|||align="left"|||MF||2016–2019||74||2
|-
|align="left"|||align="left"|||MF||2016–2019||67||2
|-
|align="left"|||align="left"|||DF||2016–20182019–2020||9||3
|-
|align="left"|||align="left"|||FW||2017||10||0
|-
|align="left"|||align="left"|||FW/MF||2017–20192021–2022||62||7
|-
|align="left"|||align="left"|||DF||2017–||194||3
|-
|align="left"|||align="left"|||GK||2018–2020||9||0
|-
|align="left"|||align="left"|||GK||2018–2022||103||0
|-
|align="left"|||align="left"|||FW/MF||2018–2019||24||4
|-
|align="left"|||align="left"|||MF||2018–2022||166||22
|-
|align="left"|||align="left"|||DF||2018–20212021–2022||48||0
|-
|align="left"|||align="left"|||GK||2018–||127||0
|-
|align="left"|||align="left"|||FW/MF||2018–2020||27||4
|-
|align="left"|||align="left"|||DF||2019–||171||11
|-
|align="left"|||align="left"|||DF||2019–2021||75||4
|-
|align="left"|||align="left"|||MF||2019–||160||17
|-
|align="left"|||align="left"|||FW/MF||2019–||145||30
|-
|align="left"|||align="left"|||FW||2019–2021||29||4
|-
|align="left"|||align="left"|||MF||2020–||86||5
|-
|align="left"|||align="left"|||MF||2020–||100||2
|-
|align="left"|||align="left"|||FW/MF||2020–||139||22
|-
|align="left"|||align="left"|||FW||2020–||90||51
|-
|align="left"|||align="left"|||FW||2020–2022||68||9
|-
|align="left"|||align="left"|||MF||2020–2021||44||2
|-
|align="left"|||align="left"|||DF||2021–||85||7
|-
|align="left"|||align="left"|||DF||2021–||39||3
|-
|align="left"|||align="left"|||MF||2021–||62||3
|-
|align="left"|Kim Min-jae||align="left"|||DF||2022–||34||2
|-
|align="left"|||align="left"|||DF||2022–||27||1
|-
|align="left"|||align="left"|||DF||2022–||7||1
|-
|align="left"|||align="left"|||MF||2022–||32||1
|-
|align="left"|||align="left"|||FW/MF||2022–||29||13
|-
|align="left"|||align="left"|||FW/MF||2022–||10||0
|-
|align="left"|||align="left"|||FW||2022–||21||5
|-
|align="left"|||align="left"|||FW||2022–||24||8
|-
|align="left"|||align="left"|||GK||2023–||1||0
|-
|align="left"|||align="left"|||DF||2023–||1||0
|-
|}

Captains
Appearances and goals are for the first team, including appearances as substitutes, correct 

Key
 GK – Goalkeeper
 DF – Defender
 MF – Midfielder
 FW' – Forward

Players in bold are still actively in team.

Nationalities are indicated by the corresponding FIFA country code.

References and notes

Players
S.S.C. Napoli players
Napoli
Association football player non-biographical articles